Bivouac Jaun is a project recorded in the Autumn of 1983 featuring Phish guitarist Trey Anastasio, Phish lyricist Tom Marshall, and one-time Phish percussionist Marc Daubert. It also features appearances from Dave Abrahams, drummer Pete Cottone, and guitarist Roger Holloway. Anastasio plays a variety of instruments on the album, with "Run Like an Antelope," and "Letter to Jimmy Page" featuring Anastasio on all instruments. Marshall plays keyboards on all tracks and Daubert handles percussion and additional guitar.

Most of these tracks would later appear on various early Phish demo tapes, including The White Tape and a compilation known as "Untitled Four-track Project."

Bivouac Jaun was never officially released but has been circulated in bootleg form since the mid-1980s; however, original copies are extremely rare.

Track listing
 Slave to the Traffic Light
 Run Like an Antelope
 The Divided Sky 
 Letter to Jimmy Page 
 Aftermath 
 Ingest 
 Prolonged Exposure
 I Am Hydrogen
 [Instrumental, title unknown]
 [Band introduction/jam, title unknown]
 Little Squirrel

This track listing is approximate. The unknown instrumental is possibly titled "King Lear"; The ending section of "Prolonged Exposure" is possibly a separate unknown song

1984 albums
Phish